The Qatar national basketball team represents Qatar in international basketball competitions. It is administrated by the Qatar Basketball Federation. The team won two bronze medals at the Asian Basketball Championship and belongs to the major contenders among Arab nations.

Competitions

World Championships

FIBA Asia Cup

Asian Games

1978 : 14th
2002 : 9th
2006 : 
2010 : 5th
2014 : 6th
2018 : 9th

Arab Nations Championship

1974-1997 : ?
1999 : 
2000-2005 : ?
2007 : 5th
2010 : ?
2011 : 
2015-2022 : ?

Pan Arab Games

1953-2004 : ?
2007 : 
2011 :

Team

Current roster

2021 FIBA Asia Cup qualification
Due to the COVID-19 pandemic, the FIBA Executive Committee decided that for the 2020 November window games will be held at a single venue under a bubble format.

Venue: Al-Gharafa Sports Club Multi-Purpose Hall, Doha

Opposition: Syria  (28 November)
Opposition: Saudi Arabia  (30 November)

Past rosters

2021 FIBA Asia Cup qualification
Opposition: Saudi Arabia  (20 February)
Venue: King Abdullah Sports City, Jeddah
Opposition: Iran  (23 February)
Venue: Azadi Basketball Hall, Tehran

2017 FIBA Asia Cup
Roster for the 2017 FIBA Asia Cup.

2016 FIBA Asia Challenge
2016 FIBA Asia Challenge squad:

2015 FIBA Asia Championship
2015 FIBA Asia Championship squad:

2014 Asian Games
2014 Asian Games squad:

2013 FIBA Asia Championship
2013 FIBA Asia Championship squad:

Head coach: Thomas Wisman

2006 FIBA World Championship
2006 FIBA World Championship squad:

Head coach: Joseph Stiebing

Notable players
Other current notable players from Qatar:

Head coach history
  Joseph Stiebing – 2003–2006
  Kent Davison – 2006
  Joseph Stiebing – 2007
  Eric Gardow - 2007-2008
  Kosay Hatem – 2011
 / Thomas Wisman – 2012–13
  Vassilis Fragkias – 2014–2017
  Kosay Hatem – 2017
  Panayiotis Yiannaras – 2018–2020
  Miodrag Perišić – 2020–present

See also
Qatar women's national basketball team
Qatar national under-19 basketball team
Qatar national under-17 basketball team
Qatar national 3x3 team

References

External links

FIBA profile
Qatar Basketball Records at FIBA Archive
Asia-basket
Presentation on Facebook

Videos
Qatar v Korea - Group F - Game Highlights - 2015 FIBA Asia Championship Youtube.com video

Men's national basketball teams
 
1973 establishments in Qatar
Basketball in Qatar